G. Raymond Chang, OC, OJ (November 23, 1948 – July 27, 2014), was a businessman, philanthropist and from 2006 until 2012, the third chancellor of Ryerson University.

Early life
He was of Hakka Chinese descent, born the fifth of 12 children to Gladstone Vernon and Maisie Chang in Kingston, Jamaica. His father was a second generation Chinese Jamaican born to Chinese immigrants while his mother was born in Guyana, also of Chinese Guyanese descent.  Upon the death of Maisie's brother, Chang's parents adopted five of their then-orphaned nieces and nephew. This newly blended and inter-related family now comprised 12 children and was raised together with Chang's other cousins on two back-to-back streets on which were constructed five houses, each built for an individual "Chang" family. In total, 35 cousins lived side-by-side "around-the-block" of five houses. Gladstone and Maisie, along with Gladstone's brothers and sisters, owned a successful bakery and several, other businesses on the island. From an early age, Gladstone and Maisie Chang insisted that all 12 children pursue a university education; after he was educated as St. George's College, Jamaica.

Education
Chang emigrated in 1967 first to Troy, New York and then to Toronto, Ontario, both times to attend university. He earned an engineering degree from the University of Toronto and went on to earn his qualifications as a Chartered Accountant and Chartered Financial Analyst and largely pursued a career in finance.

Career
He worked for Coopers & Lybrand for a time, and until 1983, when he and some partners bought into a small Toronto mutual fund management company that managed $5 million in assets. This predecessor company would grow and develop into CI Financial, which in 2014 managed $100 billion of investments. Chang started at CI Financial as vice-president and chief operating officer, and was promoted to COO and president in 1996, becoming president and CEO in 1998, and then chairman and CEO from 1999 to 2010. At that time, the Company had become the second largest publicly traded mutual fund company in Canada. Chang also owned an investment holding company, G. Raymond Chang Ltd., and founded software firm Mercatus Technologies Inc. Chang was also a shareholder and board member of various other Canadian and Jamaican companies.

Awards, decorations and philanthropy

He was appointed to the Order of Jamaica in 2011 and as an officer of the Order of Canada in 2014.

Ryerson University's G. Raymond Chang School of Continuing Education is named after him as benefactor. Chang also donated tens of millions of dollars to various institutions including Ryerson University, the Royal Ontario Museum, the Centre for Addiction and Mental Health and the University of the West Indies.  He was a board member of the Toronto General & Western Hospital Foundation, endowed The Gladstone and Maisie Chang Chair at the University of Toronto in internal medicine, and started a fellowship for West Indian doctors at the University Health Network. In 2010, he was named Outstanding Philanthropist of the Year by the Toronto Chapter of the Association of Fundraising Professionals.

Death
Chang, who suffered from leukemia, died at the age of 65, several months after undergoing a bone marrow transplant. His funeral mass occurred on August 9, 2014 at St. Patrick’s Catholic Church in Toronto and was presided over, amongst others, by Rev. Fr. Luc Amoussou, the Archbishop of Kingston Charles Dufour, followed by a reception hosted by Ryerson University at their Mattamy Athletic Centre. He is interred at Holy Cross Cemetery, Thornhill, Ontario.

References

1948 births
2014 deaths
Chancellors of Toronto Metropolitan University
Canadian university and college chancellors
Jamaican people of Chinese descent
Canadian people of Chinese descent
Canadian chief executives
Canadian chairpersons of corporations
Canadian corporate directors
Chief executives in the finance industry
Canadian philanthropists
Officers of the Order of Canada
Members of the Order of Jamaica
University of Toronto alumni
Businesspeople from Toronto
Canadian investors
Jamaican emigrants to Canada
Naturalized citizens of Canada
People from Kingston, Jamaica
Deaths from leukemia
CFA charterholders
20th-century philanthropists
Hakka people